Sir David Brown (10 May 1904 – 3 September 1993) was an English industrialist, managing director of his grandfather's  gear and machine tool business David Brown Limited and more recently David Brown Tractors, and one time owner of shipbuilders Vosper Thorneycroft and car manufacturers Aston Martin and Lagonda.

Early life

Brown was born in Park Cottage in the Yorkshire town of Huddersfield to Caroline and Frank Brown in 1904. Park Cottage was pulled down in the Second World War to make way for a new factory — on their 17-acre Park Works site in Huddersfield, Yorkshire.

Brown attended King James's Grammar School, Almondbury and Rossall School.

David Brown & Sons

After leaving school Brown started work aged 17 in 1921 as if just another apprentice in his family's business, David Brown & Sons (Huddersfield), cycling 6 miles to work by 7.30 a.m. This company which had been founded by his grandfather David, specialised in transmission components. While his father had no interest in cars and did not drive, his mother was a keen driver and as a small child he had ridden beside Frederick Tasker Burgess on test runs of David Brown & Sons new Valveless car but he did not learn to drive until aged 11.

Brown's father offered to buy him a motorcycle to help him get to work on time, so relying on his father's ignorance of motor vehicles, instead of a small docile motorcycle, Brown after considering a Harley Davidson obtained a powerful Reading Standard 1,000 cc V-twin. He subsequently improved its performance by modifying the engine and raced it in weekend hill climb competitions at Axe Edge Moor in Derbyshire and at Sutton Bank in Yorkshire.
After achieving the fastest time of the day at Axe Edge Moor he was invited to be a reserve rider for the official Douglas motorcycle team to complete at the upcoming next International Isle of Man TT (Tourist Trophy). While he attended the practice session, his father forbade him from competing in the competition.

By this time Brown was romantically involved with Daisy Muriel Firth, three years his senior. In an attempt to break up the  relationship, his father sent Brown to South Africa in 1922 to assist a director of the company in overseeing the installation of the company's gears in gold mines near Johannesburg. When the director's drinking affected his  ability to do the work, Brown took over responsibility for the project.

Upon his return from South Africa Brown decided to design and build his own car. Working in his bedroom each night until 2:00 am, he designed a 1.5-litre twin-cam, straight-eight engine. Then using the firm's foundry, he made patterns and cast the cylinder block, while using the machine shop to produce the other components. His father put a stop to the work when he caught his son working on the project in company time. Undaunted, Brown constructed a chassis, fitting it with a Sage 2-litre engine, coupled to a Meadows gear box. He called the result the “Daybro”. David Brown & Sons' gear-grinding skills brought him early contacts with Bertelli of Aston Martin for gears and Amherst Villiers for his superchargers. With the consent of Villiers, Brown modified a Vauxhall which then won its class at Shelsley Walsh for three consecutive years. It was said to be capable of more than 140 mph on the sand.

As his grounding continued in various parts of their works he progressed to foreman and then assistant works manager.

Sent to the United States, Africa and Europe in 1928 to study business methods and factory conditions he returned and started a bronze and steel foundry in Penistone where unemployment was severe. The new foundry used a new technique of steel casting and was a rapid success. As well as meeting his group's own needs the foundry made precision castings for a wide range of industries and use in aircraft airframes, aero engines, electricity power stations, oilfields and oil refineries.

In 1929 he was made a director and after his uncle Percy's death in 1931 was appointed joint managing director in 1932. In 1933 he became managing director. Under Brown's leadership, the company significantly expanded its operations.

Tractors

In 1939 David Brown & Sons acquired the old United thread mills factory on a site at Meltham, on the south side of Huddersfield. Brown, who also owned a farm, started the Ferguson-Brown Company building tractors with Harry Ferguson  in 1936 in a corner of park gear works  but they disagreed over design details, which led David Brown to design his own version the David Brown VAK1 which was introduced to the market in 1939, with over 7,700 units eventually sold. Harry Ferguson went to America and did a deal with Henry Ford to incorporate his system in the Ford N-Series tractor, before setting up Ferguson Tractors.

The Second World War saw a massive increase in the production of gears and gearboxes by David Brown Ltd for use in military equipment. The rising income from the company's traditional products and the manufacture of tractors made Brown a wealthy man.

Aston Martin

In late 1946, Brown saw a classified advertisement in The Times, offering for sale a "High Class Motor Business". The asking price was £30,000.  On inquiring further Brown discovered that the company was Aston Martin. A few days later Brown visited the company's headquarters at Feltham and test drove their new prototype design, the Atom.

While he felt it had good road handling he considered that its 2.0 litre four cylinder pushrod engine lacked power. However seeing its potential he entered into negotiations which ended in February 1947 with his acquiring the company for £20,500.
Following the purchase work began on converting the Atom into a production car. While the prototype was a saloon, Brown preferred convertibles so the chassis was redesigned to accommodate an open top. Eventually it entered production as the Aston Martin 2-Litre Sports, now commonly called the DB1.

Lagonda

In 1947 Brown heard through Tony Scratchard, the distributor of Lagonda cars in Bradford that Lagonda was in financial trouble and was for sale. While he initially took no interest in the company, when a liquidator was later appointed to sell off the company's assets, Brown sensing an opportunity visited the company. There he met with the famed engine designer W. O. Bentley, who showed him an engine called the LB6 which he had been working on for the company. It was a modern twin-cam 6-cylinder engine of 2,580 cc. Brown saw the engine as ideal for his new generation of Aston Martin models. Aware that Armstrong Siddeley, Jaguar and Rootes were also interested in the company and the liquidator was seeking offers of £250,000 Brown still decided to submit an offer, though he knew it would be the lowest. Because of the tight economic conditions and the rationing of steel, the other bidders dropped out. While the liquidator was able to sell the factory buildings to another company, to Brown's surprise he was able to obtain for £52,500 the rest of the company as well as the rights to the new engine.

As Lagonda had to vacate its premises Brown stored his new assets in some rented hangars at the London Air Park in Hanworth, which was close to the Aston Martin factory. The newly acquired engine soon saw service in the Aston Martin DB2.

In late 1955 Brown acquired the coachbuilder Tickford. He subsequently concentrated all the Aston Martin and Lagonda manufacturing at the Tickford premises in Newport Pagnell.

The legendary 'DB' series of Aston Martin cars, including the DB1 (2 Litre Sports), the DB2, the DB3, the DB4, the DB5, the DB6, DBS were named after Brown using his initials. While at the helm of the Aston Martin company, he used a rival product, a Jaguar XJ Series I, as personal transport as it was cheaper to run.

In February 1972 with the David Brown Corporation in financial difficulties the other members of the board forced Brown to sell the tractor division to Tenneco International. and Aston Martin Lagonda to a separate buyer.

The new owner of Aston Martin Lagonda dropped the DB model designation, which in 1993 was restored during Ford ownership with the introduction of the DB7. Walter Hayes chairman of Aston Martin Lagonda invited and Brown accepted the position of Honorary Life President of Aston Martin Lagonda.

Vospers Thornycroft

In 1963 the David Brown Corporation purchased a controlling interest in Vosper & Company, at which Sir David Brown became Chairman. The company merged with John I. Thornycroft & Company to create Vosper Thornycroft in 1966. The warship building division of the company was nationalised by the Labour Government in 1977, becoming a division of British Shipbuilders.. The rest of the company remained publicly quoted as a subsidiary of David Brown Corporation.  Bitter about the nationalisation Brown left Britain to live in retirement in Monte Carlo.

Sells the company

In January 1990, Brown sold his shares in the David Brown Corporation for £46 million, but retained a link with the company in his role as its honorary president.

Personal life

In his personal life Brown played polo at Ham Polo Club in the summer and during the winter he spent most weekends hunting; he was joint Master of the South Oxford hounds. He also bred hunters and racehorses on his 700-acre farm in Buckinghamshire. His greatest success was his horse Linwell winning the 1957 Cheltenham Gold Cup. Brown was a qualified pilot, had his personal De Havilland Dove, which was normally flown by his personal pilot and also established his own airfield at Crosland Moor, to the south-west of Huddersfield.

During his life he was a member of the Board of Governors of the Huddersfield Royal Infirmary, the Council of Huddersfield Chamber of Commerce and Lloyd's.

He was knighted in 1968 for services to industry.

In 1926 against the wishes of Brown's parents, who refused to attend the wedding, Brown married Daisy Muriel Firth, who he had known since he was 14. They had two children, David and Angela, both of whom entered the family business. Angela married George Abecassis the racing driver.  Following his divorce from Daisy, Brown married his secretary Marjorie Deans in 1955. This marriage also ended in divorce and he subsequently married his personal assistant, Paula Benton Stone in 1980.

Sir David Brown died in September 1993 in Monte Carlo. Eight years later David Brown Limited was acquired by Textron.

Notes

References

Further reading
 
 Driven to Succeed.

1904 births
1993 deaths
People from Huddersfield
People educated at King James's School, Almondbury
People educated at Rossall School
Businesspeople from Yorkshire
Aston Martin
Formula One team owners
Formula One team principals
Automotive businesspeople
Sports car racing team owners
British industrialists
British shipbuilders
20th-century English businesspeople